The Kingdom of Powo or sPo bo was a kingdom located in present-day Bomê County, Tibet. The ruler of Powo used the title Kanam Gyelpo (kaH gnam rgyal po) or Kanam Depa (kaH gnam sde pa).

It was said that the monarchs of Powo were descendants of Drigum Tsenpo. The kingdom was annexed by Qing China in 1910, but the King restored it the next year. In 1928, the kingdom was annexed by Tibet.

References

History of Tibet
Former countries in Chinese history
States and territories disestablished in 1928